The Barabri Party Pakistan (  BPP), a political party founded in 2017 by musician/singer, political activist, social worker and intellectual Jawad Ahmad. The party's name, Barabri, is an Urdu word meaning 'equality' because the fundamental underlying philosophy of the party is equitable distribution of resources and equality of access to opportunities for all citizens of Pakistan regardless of race, religion, ethnicity, nationality or gender.

BPP fielded 12 candidates for 5 Provincial and 7 National Assembly, including one woman, in 2018 General Elections, all of them belonging to the middle class, working class and youth, against the political stalwarts in the country. Jawad Ahmad himself challenged Imran Khan, Shehbaz Sharif and Bilawal Zardari Bhutto representing the three major political parties in Pakistan, in 2018 elections. He believes that these parties represent the elites in the country and election is a form of business for these parties. Jawad Ahmad further elaborates that ninety-nine percent of Pakistan population belongs to the middle and working class and unless candidates representing this ninety-nine percent of the population enter the parliament to work on people-centric legislation, nothing will change and status quo will keep on existing.

Ideology
The fundamental underlying ideology of the party is leftist. Equality of access over opportunities and resources for all citizens of Pakistan regardless of race, religion, ethnicity, nationality or gender.

General elections 2018
In the 2018 Pakistani general election the party won zero seats and their deposits in all contested constituencies were forfeited.

See also 
 List of political parties in Pakistan

References

External links
Barabri Party Pakistan Official Site

2017 establishments in Pakistan
Political parties in Pakistan